William Joseph "Lefty" Perrin (June 23, 1910 – June 30, 1974) was a Major League Baseball pitcher who played for one season. He played for the Cleveland Indians for one game on September 30 during the 1934 Cleveland Indians season.
He also played for the "New Orleans Pelicans" under well-known Minor League manager - Larry Gilbert, and was inducted into the New Orleans-based "Diamond Club Hall of Fame" in 1971. He was a cousin of World Champion boxer Jimmy Perrin.

External links

1910 births
1974 deaths
Cleveland Indians players
Major League Baseball pitchers
Baseball players from Louisiana
New Orleans Pelicans (baseball) players
Toledo Mud Hens players
Baltimore Orioles (IL) players
Wilkes-Barre Barons (baseball) players
Birmingham Barons players
Atlanta Crackers players
Lakeland Pilots players
Frederick Warriors players
Miami Tourists players